"After the Fall" is a song by the American rock band Journey. Written by Jonathan Cain and Steve Perry, it was the third single released from their 1983 album Frontiers.

Peaking at #23 on the Billboard Hot 100 chart, it was the band's 11th top 40 and their ninth top 25 single. It spent 12 weeks on the chart overall. It also reached #30 on the Mainstream Rock chart.

Cash Box said the song "manages to walk the tightrope between AOR and pop" and praised the guitar solo and the "near-perfect fade-out."

The song appeared in the 1983 film Risky Business, starring Tom Cruise and Rebecca De Mornay.

It was the first Journey track to feature bass guitarist Randy Jackson, who would join the band for their following album Raised on Radio and its tour and would rejoin the group in 2020.

Personnel
Steve Perry–lead vocals
Neal Schon–guitar, backing vocals
Jonathan Cain–keyboards, backing vocals
Steve Smith–drums, percussion
Ross Valory–backing vocals
Randy Jackson-bass

References

1982 songs
1983 singles
Journey (band) songs
Songs written by Jonathan Cain
Songs written by Steve Perry
1980s ballads
Rock ballads
Columbia Records singles